Scene Onnu Nammude Veedu is a 2012 Indian Malayalam-language film directed by Shyju Anthikkad.

Background
The story was written by assistant director Ottappalam Unni. Lal plays the character of Ottapalam Unni and Navya Nair returned to Malayalam cinema as the character Manju, a mother, whose world is her son. K. K. Narayanadas produced the movie. It is the final film Thilakan appeared in.

Cast 
 Lal as Ottappalam Unni
 Navya Nair as Manju
 Master Priyadarshan as Kannan
 Thilakan as Vishwan (Dubbed by his son Shobi Thilakan)
 Asif Ali as himself
 Lalu Alex as K. K. Jose
 Shritha Sivadas as Parvathy
 Harisree Ashokan as Bhasi
 Riyaz Khan as Amal
 Sudheesh
 Raghavan
 Kalabhavan Shajohn
 Sunil Sukhada
 Shivaji Guruvayoor as Rajan
 Manikuttan as Rafique
 Ambika Mohan as Shyama Teacher
 Augustine 
 Shammi Thilakan
 Sasi Kalinga
 Urmila Unni as K. K. Jose's wife
 Swapna Menon as K. K. Jose's daughter
 Anjali Aneesh Upasana as TV Reporter

Reception
One reviewer said, "The plot is borrowed from at least a dozen films made on the same theme. Yet, it is the charm of the lead pair that holds our attention."

References

External links
 Scene 1 Nammude Veedu at the Malayalam Movie Database

2012 films
2010s Malayalam-language films
Films directed by Shyju Anthikkad